Willy Adolfo Topp Bravo (born 4 March 1986), commonly known as Willy Topp or sometimes Billy Topp, is a Chilean football manager and former footballer who played as striker. Topp has also been involved with the youth levels of Chile's national set-up.

Topp started his career in his homeland with Universidad Católica, where he first played at the age of 16. He featured for them in the Milk Cup international youth tournament in 2003 and appeared on loan with other Chilean sides Temuco and Puerto Montt. In 2007, he joined Bradford City in England's League Two, but he played just 13 games in little more than a year, before he was released from his contract six months early. He spent a brief time playing semi-professionally with Jumilla Club de Fútbol in the Spanish Tercera División Group 13 before moving to Royal Montegnée.

Club career

Universidad Católica
Born in Temuco, Chile, on 4 March 1986, Topp's football career started with Universidad Católica in his native Chile at the age of 11. In the 2002–03 season, he scored 23 goals in 28 games with Católica's youth team, helping the under-20 side become champions and earning him a call up to Chile's squad for the South American under-17 tournament. Later in the year, he was selected to play for Católica in the Milk Cup international youth tournament in Northern Ireland, where the team came third. As a result of his performances in the tournament, Topp was invited to train with English side Manchester City. However, because he was not 18, he was unable to remain with the club and returned to Chile.

Topp first played for the Católica's senior teams at the age of just 16 in a friendly against Santiago Morning. He also had loan spells at Deportivo Temuco in 2005, where he suffered a broken metatarsal injury, and Club de Deportes Puerto Montt in 2006. He also came on as a substitute for Diego Maradona for the final four minutes of a charity match contested between Católica and Chile in February 2006. After his contract with Católica expired, Topp decided to leave the club and attempt to sign for a European club taking advantage of his EU passport.

Bradford City
Topp was due to sign for Belgian side Royal Racing Football Club Montegnée but instead returned to England in September 2007 for a trial with League Two side Bradford City as part of a deal between the two sides. After scoring in his first trial game for the reserves against Coventry City on 19 September, manager Stuart McCall decided to buy Topp. His protracted move took nearly three months to complete, after first a disagreement between Bradford and his former club Católica, then a hold-up with the English Football Association, before Topp was signed for £35,000 on 11 December 2007—the first time City had paid money for a player since Andy Tod in 2001. Topp made his Bradford debut as a second-half substitute in a 3–1 defeat to Hereford United on 29 December 2007. His first start came a month later when he made one goal and nearly scored another as Bradford defeated Shrewsbury Town 4–2. It was the first of four successive games in all of which he was substituted during the second half before he was diagnosed with the muscle-tightening condition posterior compartment syndrome. In March 2008, Topp visited a medical specialist to prepare for an operation on his thigh, so that he could be ready for the 2008–09 pre-season.

Topp went back home to Chile during the summer and returned to play in several pre-season friendlies but was an unused substitute for Bradford's first home league game of the season against Notts County, and was left out of the side three days later against Huddersfield Town in the League Cup after his representatives said he wanted to leave the club. Topp held talks with manager Stuart McCall and told him he wanted to stay with the club. Topp subsequently came on as a late substitute in a 2–0 victory against Macclesfield Town the following day. He made only one more appearance as substitute before he was released from his contract six months early, in December 2008, to let him find a new club. He played a total 13 games for Bradford, starting six, without scoring.

Jumilla CF
In 2009, he joined Lorca FC, but after a short time he resigned. In August 2009, after eight months out of the game, Topp joined Jumilla Club de Fútbol, a side playing in Tercera División Group 13, part of the fourth tier of Spanish football. He made his debut for Jumilla on 14 September against CD Plus Ultra when he came on as a second-half substitute during a 3–0 victory. He started the following game to help his new side defeat CD Beniel 5–0.

Royal Montegnée
In January 2010, Topp left Jumilla to return to Belgian side Royal Montegnée where he had previously been registered as a player before moving to Bradford City. Topp made his debut for Montegnee in a 4–0 victory against Oreye on 7 March, but had a poor game reported to be because of a poor selection of boots. Later the same month, Topp was sent off during a 3–1 victory, but the following weekend scored his first goal for Montegnée in another 3–1 win.

Fontsanta Fatjó
In 2016, he joined Fontsanta Fatjó, a side playing in Segona Catalana.

International career
Topp was involved in the senior Chile national team set up in 2003 and 2004 under the management of Juvenal Olmos, and has represented his country at under-17 level, once scoring a hat-trick in a game against Paraguay in September 2002. In 2003, he was in Chile's under-17 squad to play in the South American under-17 tournament. Chile failed to qualify for the FIFA World Championships in Finland later the same year, in the tournament. In December 2004, Topp scored against Uruguay for the under-20 side in a preparation game for a tournament in Colombia the following year. However, he was left out of his country's final squad for the tournament, and for the subsequent squad for the 2005 FIFA World Youth Championship in The Netherlands.

Managerial career
He began his managerial career as the manager of Fontsanta Fatjó in the Segona Catalana at the same time he was a player. Next he has worked as a coach for RCD Espanyol and Philadelphia Union Academies and CD Masnou B.

Playing statistics
Updated to 3 January 2010.

Honours
Universidad Católica
 Primera División de Chile: 2005 Clausura

References

External links

Guardian Stats Centre

1986 births
Living people
People from Temuco
Chilean footballers
Chile youth international footballers
Chilean expatriate footballers
Chilean people of English descent
Association football forwards
Club Deportivo Universidad Católica footballers
Deportes Temuco footballers
Puerto Montt footballers
Bradford City A.F.C. players
Lorca FC players
FC Jumilla players
R.R.F.C. Montegnée players
Chilean Primera División players
English Football League players
Tercera División players
Expatriate footballers in England
Chilean expatriate sportspeople in England
Expatriate footballers in Spain
Chilean expatriate sportspeople in Spain
Expatriate footballers in Belgium
Chilean expatriate sportspeople in Belgium
Chilean football managers
Chilean expatriate football managers
Philadelphia Union coaches
Expatriate football managers in Spain
Expatriate soccer managers in the United States
Chilean expatriate sportspeople in the United States